HHV may refer to:

 Help Hospitalized Veterans
Human herpes virus
 Higher heating value
 Historic Hudson Valley
 Hydraulic hybrid vehicle